Ryan Adam Haynes (born 1985) is an American politician from Tennessee. In April, 2015 he became chairman of the Tennessee Republican Party, and resigned his Tennessee House District 14 seat on May 27, 2015.

After former TNGA Representative Haynes resigned his state office on May 27, 2015 to serve as the Chairman of the Tennessee
Republican Party, Knoxville, Tennessee salesman Jason Zachary was appointed as representative by the Knox County Commission on August 12, 2015 to fill the District 14 House seat formerly held by Haynes.

Committees
Rep. Haynes was a member of the following committees during his service in the legislature. 
House Education Committee
House State & Local Government Committee
House Finance Committee

References

External links 
 Ryan Haynes at Ballotpedia
 State Page

1985 births
Living people
Politicians from Knoxville, Tennessee
Republican Party members of the Tennessee House of Representatives
State political party chairs of Tennessee